Josef Ertl (7 March 1925 – 16 November 2000) was a German politician who served as the minister of agriculture in different cabinets of Germany and was a member of the Free Democratic Party (FDP).

Early life and education
Ertl's family were from Bavaria. He was born on 7 March 1925 and raised in Munich.

Ertl held a bachelor's degree in agriculture from the Technical University Munich in 1952.

Career
Ertl was a member of the FDP to which he joined in the 1950s. He was part of the liberal right wing in the party. He served in the FDP's regional council of Munich from 1952 to 1956. He was the member of the Bundestag from 1961 to 1987. He also headed the Bavarian branch of the party from 1971 to 1983. He was among German politicians who shaped the Europe policy of the country in the 1970s.

He was appointed minister of agriculture to the coalition government led by Prime Minister Willy Brandt on 22 October 1969. Ertl replaced Hermann Höcherl in the post. He retained his post until 1983 in various cabinets, but for a short period from 17 September to 1 October 1982 Björn Engholm assumed the post.

After leaving office he served as the president of the German agricultural society from early 1984 to late 1990. He was also the president of the German ski association from 1978 to 1991.

Death
Ertl was seriously injured in an accident on the farm of his son in the Upper Bavarian district of Landsberg am Lech in the mid-November 2000. He died of complications resulting from severe burn injuries on 20 November 2000 in Murnau at the age of 75.

References

External links

1925 births
2000 deaths
Federal government ministers of Germany
Grand Crosses 1st class of the Order of Merit of the Federal Republic of Germany
Leaders of organizations
Members of the Bundestag for Bavaria
Members of the Bundestag 1983–1987
Members of the Bundestag 1980–1983
Members of the Bundestag 1976–1980
Members of the Bundestag 1972–1976
Members of the Bundestag 1969–1972
Members of the Bundestag 1965–1969
Members of the Bundestag 1961–1965
Politicians from Munich
Technical University of Munich alumni
Members of the Bundestag for the Free Democratic Party (Germany)
Nazi Party members
German military personnel of World War II
Farming accident deaths
Accidental deaths in Germany